Zachary Yuen (born March 3, 1993) is a Canadian-Chinese professional ice hockey defenceman.  He is currently an unrestricted free agent who most recently played for Kunlun Red Star of the Kontinental Hockey League (KHL). Yuen was one of the first players of Chinese descent to be drafted in the NHL Entry Draft.

Playing career
While playing with the Tri-City Americans of the Western Hockey League (WHL), Yuen became the first defenceman of Chinese descent to be drafted in the NHL Entry Draft after being selected by the Winnipeg Jets in 2011.

After playing two more seasons with the Tri-City Americans, Yuen made his professional debut with the Toronto Marlies of the American Hockey League (AHL) during the 2013–14 season. He played three games with the Marlies before being assigned to the ECHL.

Yuen signed a two-year contract with the Kunlun Red Star of the Kontinental Hockey League (KHL) in 2016, then became the first Chinese player to score for the Red Star during a 1–0 win over the Amur Khabarovsk.

International play
Yuen was called up to represent the China men's national ice hockey team for the 2022 Winter Olympics on January 28, 2022.

Personal life
Yuen was born in Vancouver, British Columbia. His father immigrated from Hong Kong and his mother was born in Vancouver after his maternal grandparents immigrated from Hong Kong.

Career statistics

Regular season and playoffs

International

References

External links

1993 births
Living people
Chinese ice hockey defencemen
Olympic ice hockey players of China
Atlanta Gladiators players
Canadian expatriate ice hockey players in China
Canadian ice hockey defencemen
Canadian sportspeople of Chinese descent
Canadian sportspeople of Hong Kong descent
Canadian emigrants to China
Naturalized citizens of the People's Republic of China
HC Kunlun Red Star players
Gwinnett Gladiators players
Idaho Steelheads (ECHL) players
KRS-BSU players
KRS Heilongjiang players
Orlando Solar Bears (ECHL) players
Ice hockey people from Vancouver
Toronto Marlies players
Tri-City Americans players
Wheeling Nailers players
Winnipeg Jets draft picks
Ice hockey players at the 2022 Winter Olympics
Canadian expatriate ice hockey players in the United States